"Claw and Hoarder: Special Ricktim's Morty" is the fourth episode of the fourth season of the Adult Swim animated television series Rick and Morty. Written by Jeff Loveness and directed by Anthony Chun, the episode was broadcast on December 8, 2019. A stand-alone sequel miniseries, Rick and Morty – Worlds Apart, was published by Oni Press from February 3 to May 5, 2021.

Plot 
After being pestered by Morty to get him a dragon, Rick reluctantly makes a deal with a wizard, who creates a soul contract between Morty and the dragon Balthromaw. Morty tries to play with Balthromaw, but it is clear Balthromaw dislikes Morty. Angered at Balthromaw damaging the floor with his fire snoring, Rick is about to evict the dragon, but they both end up realizing they have much in common and inadvertently soul bond. The Wizard then arrives, accuses Balthromaw of being a "slut dragon", and takes him away to be executed. Rick helps Morty rescue Balthromaw, since the soul bond means he will die if Balthromaw does. With the help of other "slut dragons", Rick and Morty are able to kill the Wizard, freeing all the dragons from enslavement and breaking the soul bond. Now uncomfortable with how sexual dragons are and Balthromaw's clinginess, Rick and Morty part ways with the dragon.

Meanwhile, Jerry encounters a talking cat in his bedroom, but Rick insists he has nothing to do with it. The cat convinces Jerry to take it to Florida to find fun at a beach party, but the cat betrays Jerry by framing him of defecating on the beach. Later, the cat ends up annoying everybody at the party, resulting both of them being ejected. Rick and Jerry scan the cat's mind to figure out why it can talk, and are horrified by what they see. They chase the cat away and Rick erases Jerry's memory of the incident.

In the post-credits scene, the talking cat crosses paths with Balthromaw, and asks him if he can fly him to Florida.

Casting 
The episode features guest actors Liam Cunningham as Balthromaw the dragon, Matthew Broderick as the talking cat, and Tom Kenny as Shadow Jacker.

Reception

Broadcast and ratings 
The episode was broadcast by Adult Swim on December 8, 2019. According to Nielsen Media Research, "Claw and Hoarder: Special Ricktim's Morty" was seen by 1.63 million household viewers in the United States and received a 0.98 rating among the 18–49 adult demographic.

Critical response 
Jesse Schedeen of IGN wrote that "the episode unfortunately ranks among the show's bigger misses". Steve Greene of IndieWire awarded the episode with a "B" rating describing it as a spoof of high-fantasy, with two incredible guest cast contributions keep this goofy chapter afloat.

References

External links 
 

2019 American television episodes
Dragons in popular culture
Rick and Morty episodes
Works by Jeff Loveness